NGC 4993 (also catalogued as NGC 4994 in the New General Catalogue) is a lenticular galaxy located about 140 million light-years away in the constellation Hydra. It was discovered on 26 March 1789 by William Herschel and is a member of the NGC 4993 Group. 

NGC 4993 is the site of GW170817, the first astronomical event detected in both electromagnetic and gravitational radiation, the collision of two neutron stars, a discovery given the Breakthrough of the Year award for 2017 by the journal Science. Detecting a gravitational wave event associated with the gamma-ray burst provided direct confirmation that binary neutron star collisions produce short gamma-ray bursts.

Physical characteristics
NGC 4993 has several concentric shells of stars and large dust lane with diameter of approximately a few kiloparsecs which surrounds the nucleus and is stretched out into an "s" shape. The dust lane appears to be connected to a small dust ring with a diameter of ~. These features in NGC 4993 may be the result of a recent merger with a gaseous late-type galaxy that occurred about 400 million years ago. However, Palmese et al. suggested that the galaxy involved in the merger was a gas-poor galaxy.

Dark matter content

Globular clusters
NGC 4993 has an estimated population of 250 globular clusters.

The luminosity of NGC 4993 indicates that the globular cluster system surrounding the galaxy may be dominated by metal-poor globular clusters.

Supermassive black hole
NGC 4993 has a supermassive black hole with an estimated mass of roughly 80 to 100 million solar masses.

Galactic nucleus activity
The presence of weak O III, NII and SII emission lines in the nucleus of NGC 4993 and the relatively high ratio of [NII]λ6583/Hα suggest that NGC 4993 is a low-luminosity AGN (LLAGN). The activity may have been triggered by gas from the late-type galaxy as it merged with NGC 4993.

Neutron star merger observations

In August 2017, rumors circulated regarding a short gamma-ray burst designated GRB 170817A, of the type conjectured to be emitted in the collision of two neutron stars. On 16 October 2017, the LIGO and Virgo collaborations announced that they had detected a gravitational wave event, designated GW170817. The gravitational wave signal matched prediction for the merger of two neutron stars, two seconds before the gamma-ray burst. The gravitational wave signal, which had a duration of about 100 seconds, was the first gravitational wave detection of the merger of two neutron stars.

An optical transient,  (also known as SSS 17a), was detected in NGC 4993 11 hours after the gravitational wave and gamma-ray signals, allowing the location of the merger to be determined. The optical emission is thought to be due to a kilonova. The discovery of AT 2017gfo was the first observation (and first localisation) of an electromagnetic counterpart to a gravitational wave source.

GRB 170817A was a gamma-ray burst (GRB) detected by NASA's Fermi and ESA's INTEGRAL on 17 August 2017. Although only localized to a large area of the sky, it is believed to correspond to the other two observations, in part due to its arrival time 1.7 seconds after the GW event.

See also 
 Gravitational-wave astronomy
 List of gamma-ray bursts
 List of gravitational wave observations
 Neil Gehrels Swift Observatory
 Ultra-Fast Flash Observatory Pathfinder

References

External links 

 
 
 
 
 GRB 170817A – NASA/IPAC Extragalactic Database (NED)
 GRB 170817A – Max Planck Institute for Extraterrestrial Physics (MPE)
 GRB 170817A - INTEGRAL Science Data Center (ISDC)
 The galaxy NGC 4993 in the constellation of Hydra Starmap

Active galaxies
Astronomical objects discovered in 1789
Elliptical galaxies
Lenticular galaxies
Shell galaxies
Hydra (constellation)
4993
45657